Igor Nikolaevich Sergeyev (born 11 September 1969) is a Kyrgyzstani former football player.

Career statistics

International

Scores and results list Kyrgyzstan's goal tally first, score column indicates score after each Kyrgyzstan goal.

Honours
Ak-Maral Tokmok
Kyrgyzstan Cup (1): 1994

References

External links
 
 Igor Sergeyev

1968 births
Living people
Soviet footballers
FC Orenburg players
Kyrgyzstani footballers
Kyrgyzstan international footballers
Kyrgyzstani expatriate footballers
Expatriate footballers in Russia
Kyrgyzstani expatriate sportspeople in Russia
Expatriate footballers in Israel
Kyrgyzstani expatriate sportspeople in Israel
Association football forwards
FC Nosta Novotroitsk players